Te Maire Martin (born 2 October 1995) is a New Zealand professional rugby league footballer who plays as a  and  for the New Zealand Warriors in the NRL and is a New Zealand international.

Martin previously played for the Brisbane Broncos, North Queensland Cowboys and Penrith Panthers. Martin retired in 2020 due to a bleed on the brain in April 2019 tragically cut his career short at only age 23 but returned to the NRL in 2022 with the Broncos.

Background
Martin was born in Tokoroa, New Zealand, and is of Māori descent, specifically Ngāti Kahungunu ki Wairarapa and Waikato Tainui Iwi (tribe). 

Martin played his junior football for Turangawaewae before moving to the Gold Coast, Australia and attended Keebra Park State High School on a scholarship.

Playing career

Early career
Martin was signed by the Wests Tigers and played in their Holden Cup team in 2014 and 2015, where he played in 40 matches and scored 15 tries. In both seasons of his Holden Cup career, Martin was named as the five-eighth in the Holden Cup Team of the Year. On 18 October 2014, Martin played for the Junior Kiwis against the Junior Kangaroos, playing at five-eighth and kicked the game-winning field goal, giving the Kiwis the 15-14 victory at Mt Smart Stadium. On 2 May 2015, Martin again played for the Junior Kiwis at five-eighth against the Junior Kangaroos, scoring a try in the 22-20 loss at Cbus Super Stadium.

On 24 September 2015, Martin was named in the New Zealand national rugby league team training squad for their tour of Great Britain, but did not make the final squad.

2016
Martin signed with the Penrith Panthers for the 2016 NRL season and played in the 2016 NRL Auckland Nines tournament. In Round 3 Martin made his NRL debut playing at five-eighth against the Brisbane Broncos. He scored a try and kicked the match winning field goal in the Panthers 23-22 win at Penrith Stadium. After playing just 6 games in the NRL, he suffered a season ending shoulder injury in Round 8 against the Cronulla-Sutherland Sharks. He finished off the season playing 6 games, scoring 2 tries and 1 field goal.

On 11 November, Martin made his Test debut for New Zealand, coming off the interchange in their 18-all draw with Scotland.

2017
After starting the season with the Panthers and playing seven first grade games, Martin moved to the North Queensland Cowboys mid-season on a three-year deal. In Round 17, he made his debut for the Cowboys, starting at five-eighth against the Canberra Raiders, scoring 2 tries in his club debut. On 1 October, Martin started at five-eighth in the Cowboys' 2017 NRL Grand Final loss to the Melbourne Storm, scoring the side's only try.

On 5 October, Martin was named in the New Zealand squad for the 2017 Rugby League World Cup.

2018
Martin started at five-eighth in Round 1 of the 2018 NRL season, filling in for the injured Michael Morgan and playing alongside Johnathan Thurston for the first time. When Morgan returned in Round 3, Martin played of the interchange for a number of games. In June, he started at five-eighth for New Zealand in their 36-18 loss to England at Mile High Stadium in Denver.

Later in the season, Martin shifted to fullback when Morgan was ruled out for the season, playing five games in the position.

2019
Martin started the 2019 season at five-eighth before moving to fullback in Round 3. On 1 May, the Cowboys announced that Martin would be sidelined indefinitely with a small bleed on his brain. On 9 July, Martin returned to training but missed the rest of the season. Martin's contract expired following the 2019 season but he remained at the Cowboys, undertaking pre-season training in the hope of being cleared to play rugby league again.

2020
On 12 January 2020, Martin announced his immediate retirement from rugby league. He revealed that he could not get cleared for contact training, effectively ending his career.

2022
On 7 January 2022, the Brisbane Broncos announced Te Maire would be joining the club ahead of the 2022 NRL season on a Development contract, after more than 2 years out of the professional ranks of Rugby League.  Martin had joined the Broncos in late 2021 originally on a train and trial basis however impressed and was thus awarded a permanent spot on the roster. He passed a final medical clearance and will make his return with Broncos affiliate Wynnum Manly Seagulls in the Intrust Super Cup.

"It's great to see Te Maire back in an NRL system. "Prior to his brain injury he was one hell of a player ... hugely skilful, and a very dangerous ball runner. "Te Maire joins us on a development list contract and I've no doubt will be pushing some of our other notable candidates to partner Adam Reynolds in the halves." - Broncos Head Of Football Ben Ikin

On 2 August 2022, It was announced that Te Maire would sign with the New Zealand Warriors on a 3 year deal from 2023 onwards.

Statistics

NRL
 Statistics are correct to the end of the 2019 season

International

References

External links
North Queensland Cowboys profile
NRL profile

1995 births
Living people
Junior Kiwis players
New Zealand national rugby league team players
New Zealand rugby league players
New Zealand Māori rugby league players
Penrith Panthers players
North Queensland Cowboys players
Brisbane Broncos players
New Zealand Warriors players
People educated at Keebra Park State High School
Rugby league five-eighths
Rugby league fullbacks
Rugby league players from Tokoroa
Wynnum Manly Seagulls players